Air Park South  was a public use airport in Christian County, Missouri, United States. It was owned by the City of Springfield.

In 2001, using federal and state grants, the Springfield-Branson National Airport Board purchased the airport from the City of Ozark, with the intention to use it for general aviation. In 2009, the City of Springfield authorized the airport board to sell the airport, due to the inability to purchase additional land to extend the runway.

The airport was listed in FAA records through 2011, but it had been noted as closed indefinitely since 2006.

Facilities and aircraft 
Air Park South covered an area of 130 acres (53 ha) at an elevation of 1,336 feet (407 m) above mean sea level. It had one runway designated 17/35 with an asphalt surface measuring 2,528 by 39 feet (771 x 12 m).

For the 12-month period ending November 30, 2005, the airport had 2,260 general aviation aircraft operations, an average of 43 per week. At that time there were five aircraft based at this airport, all single-engine.

See also 
 Springfield-Branson National Airport

References

External links 
 Air Park South (2K2) at Abandoned & Little-Known Airfields website
 Air Park South Airport for Sale
 Aerial image as of April 1996 from USGS The National Map via MSR Maps

Defunct airports in Missouri
Buildings and structures in Christian County, Missouri